This article shows the rosters of all participating teams at the Women's European Championship 2017 in Baku and Ganja, Azerbaijan and Tbilisi, Georgia.

Overview
Each of the 16 teams submitted a preliminary 'long list' with a maximum of 22 players, for the final tournament a maximum of 14 players from the 'long list' were eligible to compete.

Key
Player positions
 LB – Libero
 MB – Middle Blocker
 OP – Opposite
 OS – Outside Hitter / Spiker
 ST – Setter

Pool A

The following is the Azerbaijan roster in the 2017 Women's European Volleyball Championship. Only the players in bold took part in the final tournament (see 'Overview' section).

Head coach: Faig Garayev

* For players positions, see 'Key' section.

The following is the German roster in the 2017 Women's European Volleyball Championship. Only the players in bold took part in the final tournament (see 'Overview' section).

Head coach: Felix Koslowski

* For players positions, see 'Key' section.

The following is the Hungarian roster in the 2017 Women's European Volleyball Championship. Only the players in bold took part in the final tournament (see 'Overview' section).

Head coach:  Alberto Salomoni

* For players positions, see 'Key' section.

The following is the Polish roster in the 2017 Women's European Volleyball Championship. Only the players in bold took part in the final tournament (see 'Overview' section).

Head coach: Jacek Nawrocki

* For players positions, see 'Key' section.

Pool B

The following is the Belarusian roster in the 2017 Women's European Volleyball Championship. Only the players in bold took part in the final tournament (see 'Overview' section).

Head coach: Piotr Khilko

* For players positions, see 'Key' section.

The following is the Croatian roster in the 2017 Women's European Volleyball Championship. Only the players in bold took part in the final tournament (see 'Overview' section).

Head coach: Miroslav Aksentijević / Igor Lovrinov

* For players positions, see 'Key' section.

The following is the Georgian roster in the 2017 Women's European Volleyball Championship. Only the players in bold took part in the final tournament (see 'Overview' section).

Head coach: Paata Ulumbelashvili

* For players positions, see 'Key' section.

The following is the Italian roster in the 2017 Women's European Volleyball Championship. Only the players in bold took part in the final tournament (see 'Overview' section).

Head coach: Davide Mazzanti

* For players positions, see 'Key' section.

Pool C

The following is the Bulgarian roster in the 2017 Women's European Volleyball Championship. Only the players in bold took part in the final tournament (see 'Overview' section).

Head coach: Ivan Dimitrov

* For players positions, see 'Key' section.

The following is the Russian roster in the 2017 Women's European Volleyball Championship. Only the players in bold took part in the final tournament (see 'Overview' section).

Head coach: Vladimir Kuzyutkin / Konstantin Ushakov

* For players positions, see 'Key' section.

The following is the Turkish roster in the 2017 Women's European Volleyball Championship. Only the players in bold took part in the final tournament (see 'Overview' section).

Head coach:  Giovanni Guidetti

* For players positions, see 'Key' section.

The following is the Ukrainian roster in the 2017 Women's European Volleyball Championship. Only the players in bold took part in the final tournament (see 'Overview' section).

Head coach: Gariy Yegiazarov

* For players positions, see 'Key' section.

Pool D

The following is the Belgian roster in the 2017 Women's European Volleyball Championship. Only the players in bold took part in the final tournament (see 'Overview' section).

Head coach: Gert Vande Broek

* For players positions, see 'Key' section.

The following is the Czech roster in the 2017 Women's European Volleyball Championship. Only the players in bold took part in the final tournament (see 'Overview' section).

Head coach: Zdeněk Pommer

* For players positions, see 'Key' section.

The following is the Dutch roster in the 2017 Women's European Volleyball Championship. Only the players in bold took part in the final tournament (see 'Overview' section).

Head coach:  Jamie Morrison

* For players positions, see 'Key' section.

The following is the Serbian roster in the 2017 Women's European Volleyball Championship. Only the players in bold took part in the final tournament (see 'Overview' section).

Head coach: Zoran Terzić

* For players positions, see 'Key' section.

See also
 2017 Men's European Volleyball Championship squads

References

External links 
 Official website
 2017 CEV Volleyball European Championship - Women at CEV

E
Women's European Volleyball Championship